The Taiwan blue magpie (Urocissa caerulea), also called the Taiwan magpie, Formosan blue magpie, or the "long-tailed mountain lady" (Taiwanese Hokkien: Tn̂g-boé soaⁿ-niû), is a bird species in the crow family. It is endemic to Taiwan.

Taxonomy and systematics
The Taiwan blue magpie was collected by Robert Swinhoe and described by John Gould. Swinhoe translated the magpie's Hokkien name into English, calling it the "Long-tailed Mountain-Nymph". The species is sometimes placed in the genus Cissa. It forms a superspecies with the yellow-billed blue magpie (Urocissa flavirostris) and the red-billed blue magpie (Urocissa erythroryncha). The species is monotypic.

Distribution and habitat
The Taiwan blue magpie is endemic to Taiwan.

Description

It weighs .

The plumages of the male and female are similar. The head, neck and breast are black. The eyes are yellow, and the bill and feet are red. The rest of the plumage is mostly blue. The wings and tail feathers have white tips. The underwing-coverts are dark grey, and the flight feathers are light grey. The uppertail-coverts have black tips. The central pair of tail feathers are the longest. The other tail feathers have black bands. Chicks are greyish, with a short tail and greyish-blue eyes.

Behavior
Taiwan blue magpies are not very afraid of people. They can be found near human residences in the mountains or newly cultivated lands. They are gregarious and are usually found in groups of three to twelve. The birds often fly in a line, following each other. This is sometimes called "long-tailed formation".

Similar to other members of the crow family, they have a raucous call which is described as a high-pitched cackling chatter, kyak-kyak-kyak-kyak. Other calls include ga-kang, ga-kang, kwee-eep and gar-suee.'Food and feeding
Taiwan blue magpies are scavengers and omnivores. Their diet includes snakes, rodents, small insects, carrion, eggs and chicks of other birds, plants, fruits, and seeds. They also feed on food waste of humans. They sometimes store leftovers on the ground and cover them with leaves for future retrieval. Sometimes they store food in the leaves or branches.

Breeding
The breeding season is from March to July. The Taiwan blue magpie is monogamous. Females incubate eggs while males help with nest building and feeding. Their nests are built on high branches of trees. The nest is in the shape of a bowl and is made of twigs. Usually there are 3–8 eggs in a clutch. Eggs are light green in color, with brown marks. Hatching takes 17–19 days. There are 3–7 chicks per nest. Chicks leave the nest after 21–24 days, and can start flying for short distances after a few days. Some pairs breed a second time after this. The Taiwan blue magpie has helpers at the nest, mostly juveniles from previous breeding seasons. They help to feed the chicks and defend the nest. Taiwan blue magpies have a strong nest defence behaviour, and will attack intruders until they leave.

Threats
Taiwan blue magpies may be hit by cars or captured by humans. They are also killed by predators, such as the crested goshawk, white-bellied sea eagle, spot-bellied eagle owl and the Gurney's eagle.

Relationship with humans
Taiwan blue magpie is the sacred bird of Taiwan aborigine Tsou, Thao, and Bunun peoples. In the common great flood myths of Taiwan Austronesian peoples, in Tsou, Thao, and Bunun sagas, the last surviving peoples escaped from the great flood to high mountain summits as the last refuge. The sacred bird Taiwan blue magpie sacrificed itself and helped the peoples to carry the last fire tinder from Yu Shan summit back to the peoples.
 (in some versions of the sagas, the sacred bird is considered to be black bulbul).

Taiwan blue magpies have attacked humans to defend their nests. Taiwan blue magpies are sometimes illegally captured by humans, but the number of cases of this seems to have decreased.

In the 2007 National Bird Voting Campaign held by the Taiwan International Birding Association, there were over 1 million votes cast from 53 countries. The Taiwan blue magpie defeated the Mikado pheasant in the vote, but the vote was not formally accepted.

In 2017 China Airlines unveiled a Taiwan blue magpie paint scheme on an Airbus A350. The aircraft was the 100th A350 produced by Airbus.

The AIDC XAT-5 Blue Magpie advanced jet trainer is named after the Taiwan blue magpie.

Status
The IUCN Red List of Threatened Species has currently assessed the species to be of least concern as it does not meet the criteria to be vulnerable. The population trend is suspected to be stable. Due to its endemism, however, the Taiwan blue magpie has been listed as other conservation-deserving wildlife and protected by Taiwan's Wildlife Conservation Act''.

There is a small population of red-billed blue magpies that has been introduced to Wuling Farm in Taichung County (now part of Taichung City). In 2007, three hybrid chicks were found in a nest in Taichung, with red-billed and Taiwan magpie parents tending them. This caused some concern to conservationists, given the decline of the Taiwan hwamei due to the invasion of the Chinese hwamei. However, the Endemic Species Research Institute of Taiwan has been working to control red-billed magpie populations by capturing individual birds and relocating their nests.

See also
 List of protected species in Taiwan
 List of endemic birds of Taiwan
 List of endemic species of Taiwan

Notes

References

External links
Ka-shiang, Liu. "The Long-Tailed Fairy of the Forest: In Search of the Formosan Blue Magpie." Tzu Chi Quarterly.
"Formosan blue magpie." ROC Government Information Office.
Pictures of Formosan blue magpie
Sounds
Videos of Formosan blue magpie (links are at the bottom)
台灣藍鵲 (in Chinese)

Taiwan blue magpie
Endemic birds of Taiwan
Taiwan blue magpie